John Brett (fl. 1556) was a messenger for Mary I of England when she tried to have the Marian exiles returned to England. His chronicle survives, and gives us detailed information on this episode.

His chronicle is entitled, A Narrative of the Pursuit of English Refugees in Germany Under Queen Mary but is often known simply as Brett's Chronicle or Brett's Narrative.

References

Year of birth missing
Year of death missing
English chroniclers
16th-century English writers
16th-century male writers
English male non-fiction writers